Péter Lázár (2 September 1950 – 9 December 1980) was a Hungarian swimmer. He competed in three events at the 1968 Summer Olympics.

References

External links
 

1950 births
1980 deaths
Hungarian male swimmers
Olympic swimmers of Hungary
Swimmers at the 1968 Summer Olympics
People from Esztergom
Sportspeople from Komárom-Esztergom County
20th-century Hungarian people